Chip Ganassi Racing, LLC (CGR), also sometimes branded as Chip Ganassi Racing Teams, is an American auto racing organization with teams competing in the NTT IndyCar Series, IMSA WeatherTech SportsCar Championship, FIA World Endurance Championship, and Extreme E. They have formerly competed in the NASCAR Cup and Xfinity Series, Global Rallycross Championship and the Rolex Sports Car Series. It was founded in 1990 by businessman and former racecar driver Chip Ganassi, from the assets of Patrick Racing to compete in the CART IndyCar World Series.

After winning four consecutive CART championships from 1996 to 1999 with drivers Jimmy Vasser, Alex Zanardi and Juan Pablo Montoya, in 2000 Ganassi became the first CART organization to return to the Indianapolis 500 after the open-wheel "Split" between CART and the Indy Racing League in 1996. A dominant victory with Montoya would foresee the team's permanent switch to the IRL (now IndyCar Series), where further championships would be won with Scott Dixon, Dario Franchitti and Álex Palou, including another four straight from 2008 to 2011. In 2022, the team fielded the Nos. 8, 9, 10, and 48  Dallara-Hondas for Marcus Ericsson, Scott Dixon, Alex Palou and Jimmie Johnson full-time.

In 2001, Ganassi bought a majority stake in Felix Sabates' Team SABCO NASCAR team, which had operated since 1989, marking his entry into that championship as Chip Ganassi Racing with Felix Sabates and inheriting that organizations history, while also partnering to compete in the Grand-Am Rolex Sports Car Series. In 2009, Ganassi partnered with Dale Earnhardt, Inc. owner Teresa Earnhardt to merge their NASCAR operations into Ganassi's shop and run under the banner of Earnhardt Ganassi Racing with Felix Sabates. The NASCAR team dropped the Earnhardt name in 2014, and Ganassi revealed that Teresa was never truly involved with the team. Rob Kauffman, chairman of the Race Team Alliance, purchased a stake in the team in 2015. Sabates retired from his ownership role after the 2020 season. In 2021, Ganassi accepted an offer from former CGR Xfinity Series driver Justin Marks to sell the entire NASCAR operation to Marks' Trackhouse Racing Team, with the deal finalized after that season. The NASCAR program fielded full-time entries for notable drivers including Kyle Petty, Joe Nemechek, Sterling Marlin, Jimmy Spencer, Casey Mears, Montoya, Jamie McMurray, Kyle Larson, Kurt Busch and Ross Chastain

Together, they have won 14 Open Wheel titles (4 in CART, 10 in IndyCar), 5 Grand-Am sports car championships, and wins in the Indianapolis 500 (Five times), Daytona 500, Brickyard 400, 24 Hours of Daytona, 12 Hours of Sebring and a 24 Hours of Le Mans class win, and over 200 wins across all categories.

American open-wheel racing history

Drivers

Current 

8  Marcus Ericsson
9  Scott Dixon
10  Álex Palou
11  Marcus Armstrong (road and street);  Takuma Sato (Texas, Indy 500)

Drivers (chronological) 
 Eddie Cheever (1990–1992)
 Arie Luyendyk (1992–1993, 1997)
 Robby Gordon (1992)
 Didier Theys (1992)
 Michael Andretti (1994)
 Maurício Gugelmin (1994)
 Bryan Herta (1995)
 Mike Groff (1995)
 Jimmy Vasser (1995–2000, 2001: Indianapolis only)
 Alex Zanardi (1996–1998)
 Juan Pablo Montoya (1999–2000)
 Nicolas Minassian (2001)
 Memo Gidley (2001)
 Tony Stewart (2001: Indianapolis only)
 Bruno Junqueira (2001–2002)
 Jeff Ward (2002)
 Kenny Bräck (2002)
 Scott Dixon (2002–present)
 Tomas Scheckter (2003)
 Tony Renna (2004)
 Darren Manning (2004–2005)
 Jaques Lazier (2005)
 Giorgio Pantano (2005, 2012)
 Ryan Briscoe (2005, 2013: Indianapolis only, 2014)
 Dan Wheldon (2006–2008)
 Dario Franchitti (2008–2013)
 Graham Rahal (2011–2012)
 Charlie Kimball (2011–2017)
 Alex Tagliani (2013)
 Tony Kanaan (2014–2017, 2021–2022)
 Sage Karam (2015)
 Sebastián Saavedra (2015)
 Max Chilton (2016–2017)
 Ed Jones (2018)
 Felix Rosenqvist (2019–2020)
 Marcus Ericsson (2020–Present)
 Álex Palou (2021–Present)
 Jimmie Johnson (2021–2022)
 Marcus Armstrong (2023-Present)
 Takuma Sato (2023-Present)

CART history 
 

In 1989, Chip Ganassi, who had driven in the IndyCar World Series but had his career cut short due to a career-ending crash at Michigan in 1984, joined Pat Patrick as co-owner for Emerson Fittipaldi's Marlboro IndyCar team. Patrick had announced he was going to retire at the end of the year, and the team would go completely to Ganassi. The team won the Indy 500 and the IndyCar Championship.

By season's end, Patrick had second thoughts. Instead of retracting the sale of the team to Ganassi, he went ahead with the deal as planned and instead restarted his team by taking over the upstart Alfa Romeo IndyCar effort for 1990. Fittipaldi took the Marlboro sponsorship to Team Penske, an arrangement that was also pre-planned. (Penske had supplied Patrick with a fleet of Penske chassis for 1989 as part of the deal).

Ganassi officially took over the remaining assets of the team (including the 1989 Penske chassis) and renamed it Chip Ganassi Racing. He signed former Formula One driver Eddie Cheever and raced full-time in the IndyCar World series with Target as the primary sponsor.

In 1992, Ganassi expanded to a two-car effort for the Indy 500, adding Arie Luyendyk for the Indy-only entry. Later Ganassi debuted rookie Robby Gordon in selected events. For 1993, Luyendyk replaced Cheever full-time. Luyendyk won the pole position for the Indy 500 and finished second to Fittipaldi, Ganassi's former driver in his partnership with Patrick. He scored Ganassi's first IndyCar victory at Surfers Paradise.

Target continued to sponsor Ganassi's operation through the decade, and by the mid part of the decade, the team had risen to the top of the series. Perhaps the most impressive was Juan Pablo Montoya winning the championship in his rookie season in 1999.  They won four consecutive series championships, with Jimmy Vasser (1996), Alex Zanardi (1997–1998), and Montoya in 1999, becoming the first car owner to win four consecutive CART championships.  In 2000, Ganassi became the first CART team to break ranks and return to race in the Indianapolis 500, part of the rival Indy Racing League. The team saw instant success as Montoya dominated the race. Montoya also became the first driver to win the Indianapolis 500 and the Michigan 500 in the same year since Rick Mears in 1991. However, he was unable to duplicate his championship success of 1999. Vasser's performance steadily dwindled, as his lone victory at Houston was his first in nearly two years.

The team ran from 1992 to 2002 before moving into the Indy Racing League full-time. They had run one IRL entry for former motocross racer Jeff Ward in 2002, in which Ward won one race at Texas in one of the closest finishes in IRL history.

IndyCar Series history 

Chip Ganassi Racing initially entered the Indy Racing League (IRL) with Juan Pablo Montoya and Jimmy Vasser in the 2000 Indianapolis 500 won by rookie Montoya. In 2001, they returned to Indy with Vasser, Bruno Junqueira, Nicolas Minassian, and NASCAR's Tony Stewart, who would also compete in that evening's Coca-Cola 600. But in neither year did they run the entire IndyCar Series season.

For 2002, Ganassi made the jump to the IndyCar Series full-time with Jeff Ward driving one car, with the addition of Ganassi's two CART Championship drivers Kenny Bräck and Bruno Junqueira at Indianapolis. None of those three would drive for Ganassi in 2003; the replacements were Scott Dixon – a midseason addition to Ganassi's Champ Car team in 2002 – and Tomas Scheckter.  Dixon won three races and the series championship while Scheckter struggled and was released from his contract. Tony Renna was due to replace him, but was killed in a testing crash at Indianapolis. Englishman Darren Manning wound up in the seat for 2004. The team's performance suffered the next two seasons and when Manning was fired, a bevy of drivers ran in Ganassi's cars, among them former Formula One test drivers Ryan Briscoe and Giorgio Pantano, and Jaques Lazier. For 2006, Ganassi scaled back to two cars, with Dixon returning along with 2005 Indianapolis 500 Champion Dan Wheldon, whom Ganassi signed away from Andretti Green Racing in the offseason. The team also changed to Honda engines (due to series engine supplier standardization from 2006 to 2011 seasons), along with all other IndyCar teams, and Dallara chassis for 2006.

The 2007 IndyCar Series season showed promise for Ganassi, as Dixon took 4 wins at Watkins Glen, Nashville, Mid Ohio, and Sonoma and Wheldon took 2 additional wins at Homestead and Kansas. The 2008 IndyCar season was even stronger for the team with eventual champion Dixon taking wins at Homestead, Indianapolis, Texas, Nashville, Edmonton, and Kentucky, and teammate Wheldon finishing 4th overall after winning at Kansas again and at Iowa. Shortly before the conclusion of the season it was announced that Wheldon would not return as Dixon's teammate in 2009, a role taken by 2007 IndyCar Champion and Indy 500 winner Dario Franchitti of Scotland. Franchitti teamed with Dixon for the non-championship race at Surfers' Paradise at the end of 2008.

The Target Chip Ganassi car driven by Franchitti won the 94th running of the Indianapolis 500 on Sunday May 30, 2010.

For 2011, Ganassi expanded, to add an additional 2-car team for Graham Rahal and Charlie Kimball housed in the race shop of NHRA drag racer Kenny Bernstein.

Ganassi announced that in 2012, all 4 cars would be powered by Honda engines after the series decided to have multiple engine manufacturers (Honda, Chevrolet, and Lotus) for the first time since 2005.

The Ganassi cars driven by Franchitti and Dixon came in first and second in the 2012 Indianapolis 500 on Sunday, May 27, 2012. It was Franchitti's third Indianapolis 500 win and his second win with Ganassi. Rahal left Ganassi following the season for his father's team, Rahal Letterman Lanigan Racing. In 2013, the team was dominant for the second half of the year, with Kimball's first win at Mid-Ohio, and Dixon adding four wins to overtake Hélio Castroneves for his third IndyCar title. The team also ran a fourth car, the No. 8, at Indianapolis for Briscoe, sponsored by NTT DATA. Despite the title, Ganassi was dealt a major blow when Franchitti was medically forced into retirement following a crash at Race 2 in Houston. Alex Tagliani replaced Franchitti at Auto Club.

In 2014, Ganassi switched to Chevrolet engines. In a twist, Ganassi would hire 2013 Indy 500 winner Tony Kanaan to drive the No. 10 Target car, while Briscoe and NTT Data signed on for a full season in the No. 8 car. The team once again struggled during the first half of the season, but hit its stride during the second half, with Dixon winning at Mid-Ohio and Sonoma, while Kanaan won the season finale at Auto Club. For 2015, the team would sign Indy Lights champion Sage Karam to share the No. 8 with Sebastián Saavedra. Dixon would claim his fourth title in a tiebreaker with Juan Pablo Montoya on the strength of three wins at Long Beach, Texas, and Sonoma. Kanaan would not win that year but had two runner-up finishes at Texas and Fontana. Both Karam and Saavedra would struggle in the No. 8, save for a lone podium by Karam at Iowa. For 2016, Ganassi would replace Karam and Saavedra with former Formula 1 driver Max Chilton. 2016 would be a down year for the team, with Dixon winning twice at Phoenix and Watkins Glen, while Kanaan had only two podiums while Chilton and Kimball struggled.

Beginning in the 2017 season, Ganassi changed engine suppliers back to Honda, retaining their four drivers. Also, 2017 marked the end of Target sponsorship in Indycar, as a new chairman elected to change the retail giant's sporting sponsorships.

For 2018, Ganassi would downsize to two cars, with Kimball and Chilton taking their sponsorship over to Carlin due to the team's cost-efficiency. Scott Dixon remains in the No. 9 with sponsorship from PNC Bank. In addition, Ganassi signed the 2017 Indycar Rookie of the Year Ed Jones to drive the No. 10 car in 2018, with sponsorship from NTT Data, replacing Tony Kanaan. Dixon would win his fifth IndyCar title on the strength of wins at Detroit, Texas, and Toronto. Jones would only have two podiums and was released at season's end in favor of Formula E driver Felix Rosenqvist.

For the 2019 season, Dixon would again find victory at Detroit as well as Mid-Ohio, but an inconsistent season would leave him a distant fourth in points. Rosenqvist would have a consistent season, fending off Colton Herta for Rookie of the Year honors. The 2020 season saw the return of its No. 8 entry, driven by former Alfa Romeo Racing driver Marcus Ericsson.

Scott Dixon started the delayed 2020 season very strong, winning the first three races at Texas, Indianapolis, and Road America. Dixon also went on to win at Gateway en route to his 6th Indycar championship. In the No. 10, Rosenqvist would score his first win at Road America.

For 2021, Felix Rosenqvist left the team to join Arrow McLaren SP with Alex Palou taking his seat. The team also expanded to 4 cars for the first time since 2017 with 7 time NASCAR Cup Series champion Jimmie Johnson driving the road and street courses in the No. 48 car. For the ovals, they have former driver Tony Kanaan. The team scored the most wins by any team in the IndyCar series. Dixon would take only one win on the season and was not able his title. His teammates Palou and Ericsson had breakout years. Ericsson took wins at Detroit and the inaugural round at Nashville while Palou would take wins at Barber, Road America, and Portland to win his first IndyCar championship. Palou would become the third Ganassi driver to win the IndyCar Series championship since the team joined the IndyCar Series and the first one other than Dixon since 2011.

IndyCar champions

Indianapolis 500 victories

Firestone Indy Lights Series 
On December 20, 2006, Chip Ganassi Racing announced that it would field an Indy Lights team for the first time in 2007, with drivers Chris Festa and Pablo Pérez. Perez was severely injured in a crash in the opening race of the Indy Lights season and was not replaced. Festa finished 10th in points without winning a race in a season dominated by Alex Lloyd who was signed by Chip Ganassi Racing at the end of the season. The team partnered with Integra Motorsports in 2007 and 2008 fielding a variety of development drivers, notably New Zealanders Marc Williams and Jonny Reid.

Racing results

Complete CART FedEx Championship Series results 
(key) (results in bold indicate pole position; results in italics indicate fastest lap)

 The Firestone Firehawk 600 was canceled after qualifying due to excessive g-forces on the drivers.

Complete IndyCar Series results 
(key)

* Season still in progress

  Non-points-paying, exhibition race.
  The final race at Las Vegas was canceled due to Dan Wheldon's death.

IndyCar wins

NASCAR

Sports car entries

Grand-Am
Initially, CGR fielded the 01 Lexus-Riley car driven by Scott Pruett and Max Papis. Their second team car, the 02, was driven by Jimmy Morales and Luis Diaz. CGR won the 2006 24 Hours of Daytona with Ganassi IRL drivers Dan Wheldon and Scott Dixon along with NASCAR driver Casey Mears. In 2007, Ganassi won the race again, this time with Pruett, former Formula 1 driver Juan Pablo Montoya, and Salvador Duran, making him the first owner to win it in back to back years since Al Holbert in 1986–87. In 2008 Chip Ganassi Racing won a third Daytona 24 in a row. Also in 2008, Chip Ganassi Racing won their 3rd Grand-Am Championship, with drivers Scott Pruett, and Memo Rojas. It was Pruett's 8th Road Racing Championship. Also participating was Memo Rojas, the first Mexican to win a major Road Racing title in North America. For the 2010 Grand-Am season the team switched from Lexus-Riley to BMW-Riley. Rojas and Pruett won 9 out of 12 races and eventually won the Grand-Am championship.

2011 Rolex 24 victory 
Ganassi's Grand-Am Series team started 2011 in the best possible fashion, earning a one-two finish in the Rolex 24 Hours of Daytona endurance race. Ganassi's two cars ran towards the front of the field for the majority of the race, and driver Scott Pruett, having started third, defeated Scott Dixon by a margin of victory of over two seconds in a one-lap sprint to the finish after a late caution period.

The victory made Ganassi the first racing team owner to win the four of the most important races in North American auto racing, the Daytona 500, Indianapolis 500, Brickyard 400, and 24 Hours of Daytona, within the same 12-month span. It was Pruett's fourth win in the event; for co-driver Memo Rojas, his second victory, while co-drivers Joey Hand and Graham Rahal won for the first time, the latter thirty years after his father, Bobby Rahal, won the event.

IMSA WeatherTech SportsCar Championship
CGR would field a Riley-Ford Daytona Prototype in the inaugural season of the merged United SportsCar Championship for Scott Pruett and Memo Rojas, winning three races. In 2015, Rojas was replaced by ex-BMW works driver Joey Hand, and the team fielded an "all-star car" at Daytona consisting of the teams IndyCar and NASCAR drivers.

For 2016, the team would move to the GTLM class with the brand new Ford GT, and thus the Daytona Prototype programme officially disbanded. Long time Ganassi driver Pruett would no longer have a place on the team, as Hand would partner with Dirk Müller (another ex-BMW works driver), while Ryan Briscoe and Richard Westbrook were hired to drive the second GT. For Daytona, the team would bring out the Riley DPs one last time, the IndyCar/NASCAR "all-star car" being joined by a team of Alexander Wurz, Brendon Hartley, Andy Priaulx, and Lance Stroll, in the last Rolex 24 of the DP era.

IMSA Race Results

WeatherTech SportsCar Championship wins

FIA World Endurance Championship 
On 12 June 2015, at Le Mans, it was announced that Ford will return to the 2016 24 Hours of Le Mans in 2016 with a factory-supported, four-car effort operating as Ford Chip Ganassi Racing and thus marked Ford's return to international automobile road racing as a full-factory entrant since 2004 Formula One season but under Jaguar Racing F1 Team banner after eleven-year absence. The cars will be campaigned by Chip Ganassi Racing in the IMSA WeatherTech SportsCar Championship, and by Multimatic Motorsports Europe (joint-venture) in the FIA World Endurance Championship under the Ford Chip Ganassi Team UK banner.

With the Chip Ganassi teams racing their GT, Ford has had podium wins in the FIA GT manufacturer's category both years that it has competed.

Notable Team Chip Ganassi UK/US Accomplishments
FIA World Endurance Cup for GT Manufacturers
2016 3rd Place: Ford
2017 2nd Place: Ford 

FIA Endurance Trophy for LMGTE Pro Teams
2016 2nd Place: Car #67
2016 4th Place: Car #66
2017 2nd Place: Car #67
2017 7th Place: Car #66 

World Endurance Cup for GT Drivers
2016: S. Mücke & O. Pla ranked 4th 
2016: A. Priaulx, H. Tincknell ranked 5th 
2016: B. Johnson ranked 9th 
2016: M. Franchitti 13th
2017: A. Priaulx, H. Tincknell ranked 3rd
2017: S. Mücke & O. Pla ranked 8th
2017: L. Derani ranked 10th
2017: B. Johnson ranked 12th 

Pole Positions
2016 6 Hours of Fuji: #66 Car (Mücke, Pla)
2016 6 Hours of Shanghai: #67 Car (Priaulx, Tincknell)
2017 6 Hours of Silverstone: #67 Car (Priaulx, Tincknell, Derani)
2018 6 Hours of Spa-Francorchamps: #67 Car (Priaulx, Tincknell, Kanaan)

Fastest Laps
2016 Le Mans 24 Hours: Scott Dixon in #69 at 3:51.514 
2016 6 Hours of Circuit of the Americas: Olivier Pla at in #66 2:05.244
2016 6 Hours of Fuji: Harry Tincknell in #67 at 1:38.575
2017 6 Hours of Silverstone: Andy Priaulx in #67 at 1:57.416
2017 6 Hours of Shanghai: Olivier Pla in #66 at 2:02.154

FIA World Endurance Championship Race Results

Global RallyCross Championship 
Ganassi expressed plans to start a team in the AMA Supercross Championship, but in late 2014, Ganassi attended the Global RallyCross Championship's season-ending race in Las Vegas, and as a result, expressed interest in fielding a GRC team. On March 18, 2015, Ganassi announced the creation of a team that began competing in the GRC in 2015. The team is based in the NASCAR shop in Concord, North Carolina, and is led by former Ford World Rally Team engineer Carl Goodman. The team hired former JR Motorsports NASCAR driver Steve Arpin and 13-time X Games medalist Brian Deegan to run the No. 00 and 38 M-Sport Ford Fiestas, respectively. Arpin contested the full season, while Deegan competed in seven of the season's twelve races.

In 2016 Arpin and Deegan were back full-time. Arpin earned the team's first win at Daytona.

In 2017, Ganassi announced he would shut down the Global RallyCross program to focus on other series. The team's assets were acquired by Loenbro Motorsports.

Complete Global RallyCross Championship results

Supercar

Race cancelled.

Extreme E 
In May 2020, CGR joined the Extreme E electric racing series for its inaugural season in 2021. A month later, the team signed Sara Price to race one of two entries, making her the first confirmed Extreme E racer and the first female driver in team history. Lucas Oil Off Road Racing Series champion Kyle LeDuc joined CGR in July. In December, Sycamore Entertainment signed a multiyear sponsorship deal with CGR, where the team entered the 2021 season as Segi TV Chip Ganassi Racing. In January 2021, GMC announced a multiyear sponsorship deal with CGR which sees the team rebranded as GMC Hummer EV Chip Ganassi Racing and the team's Spark ODYSSEY 21 body styled as the Hummer EV for the 2022 season onwards. CGR’s Extreme E team picked up their first series victory on July 7, 2022, with Price becoming the first woman in the organization’s history to drive a race-winning car.

Racing overview

Racing summary

Complete Extreme E results

(Races in bold indicate best qualifiers; races in italics indicate fastest super sector)

Footnotes

References

External links 

  
 IndyCar Team Page – Target Chip Ganassi Racing
 IndyCar Team Page – Novo Nordisk Chip Ganassi Racing
 IndyCar Team Page – Service Central Chip Ganassi Racing
 Chip Ganassi's owner statistics at Racing-Reference

American auto racing teams
Sports teams in Indianapolis
Companies based in Indianapolis
Companies based in North Carolina
Grand American Road Racing Association teams
IndyCar Series teams
Champ Car teams
Indy Lights teams
WeatherTech SportsCar Championship teams
Global RallyCross Championship teams
FIA World Endurance Championship teams
Ford in motorsport
24 Hours of Le Mans teams